The ITV television network of the United Kingdom is divided into a number of geographical regions.

Since 2002, all regions share the same programming except for regional news, weather and advertising. Historically, the regions were independent stations, each with its own schedule and branding.

Current regions

The table below lists the current 14 regions and 23 sub-regions for ITV and its two associated channels, the timeshifted ITV +1 and the high-definition ITV HD.

While the main SD channels (ITV1, UTV, and STV) on the Freeview platform provide a service for all 23 sub-regions, some sub-regional services are not available on some of the other channels and platforms, and another service is substituted instead, as indicated in the table.

Most Freeview transmitter areas overlap to some extent, so ITV regional services can often be received beyond the service areas indicated. Regional and sub-regional news and weather coverage may extend to include overlap areas.

The other ITV channels such as ITV2, ITV3 and ITV4, are not divided into regions, and each broadcasts a single service across the country.

History

Regional branding 1955–2006
Independent Television began as a franchised network of independently-owned regional companies that were both broadcasters and programme makers. Each regional station was responsible for its own branding, scheduling and advertising, with many peak-time programmes shared simultaneously across the whole network. The companies serving London, the Midlands, North West England and Yorkshire (which were the first to start broadcasting in 1955 and 1956) were responsible for making or commissioning the majority of nationally-networked programmes; these companies were known as the "Big Four" before 1968 and the "Big Five" afterwards (reflecting the number of companies). Every company made its own regional programmes.

The network began with companies serving London in 1955, and gradually grew until all companies were on air by 1962, and continued to grow as more transmitters were provided for existing companies during the 1960s and 1970s. Over time, some companies lost their franchises and were replaced by others, and the regions covered by some franchises were changed. From 1993, mergers between ITV companies became possible; as a result, companies began to take each other over to increase efficiencies and to expand. By 2004, all of the ITV franchises in England and Wales were owned by the newly-formed ITV plc, the four other franchises being Scottish TV, Grampian TV, UTV and Channel.

Regional continuity branding

The list below indicates the on-air brand names predominantly used by each regional company, which may differ from the official company name or franchise name. Each company used its own branding: 
 as station identification in continuity announcements and programme trailers in its own region;
 within its own regional news programmes;
 as production logos on every programme that it made or commissioned (whether for local or national broadcast).
Thus companies' brands were often seen by viewers outside their own areas, especially the Big Four/Five brands. From 1989, a national ITV corporate identity was established, which saw regional brands combined with the national ITV brand, although the balance between regional and national brands varied from company to company.

By 2002, all regional companies in England and Wales were owned by either Granada plc or Carlton Communications. These companies carried identical schedules, except for regional news and weather which continued to use joint regional and ITV1 branding. At all other times national ITV1 branding alone was used in England but not Wales. Two years later, Granada and Carlton merged to form ITV plc. Regional branding in England was completely abolished in 2006.

Some regions were divided into sub-regions for the purposes of regional news and advertising, but these sub-regions were not usually identified by on-air branding and consequently are not shown here (with the exception of Wales and the West of England which, after 1964, were managed under a single franchise but are shown as separate regions).

In the table above coloured highlights denote companies whose broadcasting times were limited:
  denotes weekdays only;
  denotes weekends only;
  denotes breakfast time only (when all other ITV franchises were off air).

Ownership of regional companies

National branding from 2002

From 2002, all regional companies in England used national ITV1 branding alone for networked programmes. Similarly in Scotland, both the Scottish and Grampian regions were rebranded in 2006 as "STV" at all times.

National continuity branding

Continuity branding used for networked programmes, that is, excluding regional programmes.

Franchise and news regions

With all English franchises owned by ITV plc, there have been times when the news regions have not coincided with the official franchise regions. These exceptions are listed in the tables below. For the names of the regional news programmes, see .

ITV network regions and sub-regions continue to be used by ITV Media to sell different advertisements in each sub-region.

Production branding
Each regional company was not just a broadcaster but also a television production company. After mergers, all the production arms of the companies acquired by ITV plc were taken over by Granada Productions, which became ITV Studios in 2009. The two STV regions formed SMG Productions, which became STV Productions and then STV Studios.

Notes

References

ITV-related lists